Emil Gargorov (born 15 February 1981) is a Bulgarian footballer who plays as an attacking midfielder for Vitosha Bistritsa.

Career
Born in Sofia, Gargorov came through the youth system at Lokomotiv Sofia. He made his first-team debut in a 2–0 away loss against Shumen at Panayot Volov Stadium on 10 April 1999.

In 2002, he signed with CSKA Sofia, for which he played 121 games and scored 57 goals. On 26 July 2006, he signed for RC Strasbourg. For the first half of 2008, from January to June, he was sent on loan back to CSKA Sofia. On 17 June 2010, Gargorov signed the Romanian team FC Universitatea Craiova. In the winter transfer window of 2011, he was released from the Romanian side and was signed by his former club CSKA Sofia. However, on 1 June 2011, Gargorov relocated to Razgrad, to sign with newly promoted Ludogorets for two years. On 11 September 2011, Gargorov netted a hat-trick in the 6–0 home win against Slavia Sofia in an A PFG match. He parted ways with the team from Razgrad in the summer of 2013.

On 13 July 2014, Gargorov transferred to China League One side Shijiazhuang Yongchang.

On 15 September 2017, Gargorov signed with Third League club CSKA 1948. In February 2019, he joined Vitosha Bistritsa. Gargorov received his first red card on 23 September 2019, in the 0:1 away loss against Etar Veliko Tarnovo.

Career statistics

Club

International goals

Honours

Club
CSKA Sofia
 A Group (3): 2002–03, 2004–05, 2007–08
 Bulgarian Cup (2): 2005–06,  2010–11

Ludogorets Razgrad
 A Group (2): 2011–12, 2012–13
 Bulgarian Cup: 2011–12
 Bulgarian Supercup: 2012

Individual
Razgrad sportsman of the year (2): 2011, 2012

References

External links

Living people
1981 births
Bulgarian footballers
Bulgarian expatriate footballers
Bulgaria international footballers
FC Lokomotiv 1929 Sofia players
PFC CSKA Sofia players
RC Strasbourg Alsace players
FC U Craiova 1948 players
PFC Ludogorets Razgrad players
Cangzhou Mighty Lions F.C. players
PFC Lokomotiv Plovdiv players
PFC Beroe Stara Zagora players
FC CSKA 1948 Sofia players
FC Vitosha Bistritsa players
First Professional Football League (Bulgaria) players
Second Professional Football League (Bulgaria) players
Ligue 1 players
Ligue 2 players
Liga I players
China League One players
Expatriate footballers in France
Bulgarian expatriate sportspeople in France
Expatriate footballers in Romania
Expatriate footballers in China
Association football midfielders
Footballers from Sofia